Kozina is a Slavic surname that may refer to:
Jan Sladký Kozina (1652–1695), Czech revolutionary leader
Krešimir Kozina (born 1990), Croatian handball player
Marjan Kozina (1907–1966), Slovene composer
Tony Kozina (born 1970), American professional wrestler
Andrej Kozina (1997–), Croatian philosopher, writer & filmmaker

See also
 
Kozin (surname)